Brněnec is a municipality and village in Svitavy District in the Pardubice Region of the Czech Republic. It has about 1,300 inhabitants.

Administrative parts
Villages of Chrastová Lhota, Moravská Chrastová and Podlesí are administrative parts of Brněnec.

Geography
It lies in the Svitavy Uplands. It is situated at the confluence of the Svitava River and Chrastovský Stream, and the built-up area is located in the valleys of these two watercourses.

History
Next to an old trade route, the settlement of Moravská Chrastová was founded after 1200 by monks from a monastery in Litomyšl. Moravská Chrastová was first mentioned in a document from 1323. The first written mention of Brněnec is to be found in the 1557 act of partition of the dominion of Svojanov. Until the 18th century it was a part of Bělá nad Svitavou.

With the construction of the railway from Prague to Brno (before 1850?), Brněnec received its own railway station on this main line. This encouraged numerous new industrial enterprises such as textile factories to develop around the dominant business of the Daubek mills.

Until 1918, Brněnec was part of the Austrian empire (Austria side after the compromise of 1867), in the Polička District, one of the 94 Bezirkshauptmannschaften in Bohemia. A post-office was opened in 1869.

In 1930, the municipality of Brněnec (including the then parts of Zářečí nad Svitavou, now part of the municipality of Březová nad Svitavou, and Podlesí counted 606 inhabitants, of whom 208 held German nationality. In 1939, as a result of German occupation and the ensuing retreat of Czech inhabitants, the total population had dropped to 490.

The municipality extended at that time only to the Bohemian right bank of the river Svitava. On the opposite Moravian bank was the independent municipality of Moravská Chrastová, which, together with its administrative parts of Chrastová Lhota and Půlpecen (now part of the municipality of Chrastavec), had a total population in 1939 of 1,143 inhabitants and was therefore twice the size of Brněnec.

The town of Brněnec formed part of the administrative and judiciary region of Politschka. After the annexation of the Sudetenland by Nazi Germany, it was integrated into the county of Zwittau.

The factory

The Löw-Beer Jewish family founded a textile producing company in the 1810s, and in 1855 rebuilt an old paper mill in Brněnec into the textile factory. In 1938, it was taken over by Germans.

In 1944, Oskar Schindler relocated his German Enamelware Factory and the associated prison camp of 1,200 Jewish forced labourers from Kraków to a munitions factory acquired by him in Brněnec. The Jewish workforce thus escaped transport to the extermination camps and was liberated along with the rest of the municipality on 10 May 1945 by the Red Army, after the factory had been fully operational for seven months. The Endowment Fund for the Memorial of the Shoah and Oskar Schindler is currently engaged in turning the ruins of the factory into a museum.

Notable people
Oskar Schindler (1908–1974), World War II-era industrialist who saved 1,200 Jewish lives

References

External links

Microregion Brněnec 

Villages in Svitavy District